Amandeep Kaur (born January 1, 1976) is a member of the India women's national field hockey team. She played with the team when it won the Gold at the 2002 Commonwealth Games.

References 

1976 births
Indian female field hockey players
Field hockey players at the 2002 Commonwealth Games
Commonwealth Games gold medallists for India
Living people
Punjabi people
Field hockey players at the 1998 Asian Games
Field hockey players at the 2002 Asian Games
Commonwealth Games medallists in field hockey
21st-century Indian women
21st-century Indian people
Asian Games medalists in field hockey
Asian Games silver medalists for India
Medalists at the 1998 Asian Games
Medallists at the 2002 Commonwealth Games